Noeline Edith "Bub" Bridger  (15 July 1924 – 8 December 2009) was a New Zealand poet and short story writer and actor, who often performed her own work and drew inspiration from her Māori, Irish and English ancestry.

Early life
Bridger was born in Napier, New Zealand, of Ngāti Kahungunu and Irish descent. She grew up in Napier during the depression years.  She attended several primary schools in the region followed by Napier Intermediate, and then one year at Napier Girls' High School. She left school after the third form and found work in Napier in local factories. In 1942, Bridger moved with her father to Wellington and worked in the Social Security Department. She married and had four children, but the marriage failed and she raised the children on her own.

Writing
Bridger was interested in writing from an early age. During her school years, she excelled in reading and writing. After her children had grown up, at the age of 50 she enrolled in a creative writing course being held at Victoria University in 1974, taught by Michael King.  Describing her experience at this course, she said: "Michael was the one who showed me the way. When he read my first short story he said: ‘You are going to be a writer.’"

Bridger's first published story, The Stallion, featured in the New Zealand Listener in 1975.

Her writing was largely anthologized and she published several book-length collections of poetry, including Up Here on the Hill (1989) and Wild Daises: The Best of Bub Bridger. Her writing is known for its energy, comedy and the use of fantasy.

Performance
Bridger was a well-known performer who acted on stage, notably with Hens' Teeth Women's Comedy Company, and she also wrote for television and broadcast radio.

Later years
Bridger moved to Westport in 1994 and then to Granity.  She died at her home in Granity on 8 December 2009, aged 85.

Honours and awards
In the 2002 Queen's Birthday and Golden Jubilee Honours, Bridger was appointed a Member of the New Zealand Order of Merit, for services to literature.

References

Bibliography

External links 
 Bub Bridger at Kōmako
 Bub Bridger at Read NZ Te Pou Muramura

1924 births
2009 deaths
New Zealand women poets
New Zealand women short story writers
New Zealand Māori writers
New Zealand people of English descent
New Zealand people of Irish descent
20th-century New Zealand poets
20th-century New Zealand short story writers
20th-century New Zealand women writers
Members of the New Zealand Order of Merit
Ngāti Kahungunu people
People educated at Napier Girls' High School
People from Napier, New Zealand